"Especially for You" is a song performed by Australian recording artists Kylie Minogue and Jason Donovan from Donovan's debut album, Ten Good Reasons (1989). The song was released as his album's second single on 28 November 1988 and was written and produced by Stock Aitken Waterman (SAW).

"Especially for You" received many positive reviews from older and contemporary critics, who deemed it one of the strongest of each singer's album, but also dubbed the song a classic. The song had commercial success, reaching number one in the UK, Ireland, Greece, and Belgium and peaking inside the top five in several other countries, including Australia, New Zealand, France, Finland, and Switzerland. In 2015, the song was voted by the British public as the nation's 20th favourite 1980s number one in a poll for ITV, and in 2021, Classic Pop magazine ranked it number 23 in their list of "Top 40 Stock Aitken Waterman songs".

Background
Minogue and Donovan had both appeared on the hit Australian TV series Neighbours, building a considerable following as an onscreen couple in both Australia and the UK. They were also the subject of much media and public speculation about their off-screen romance, which at the time of this release they were still denying, in an effort to protect their privacy. 

Minogue had released the album Kylie, while Donovan was working on his debut album Ten Good Reasons. Both singers were produced by Mike Stock, Matt Aitken and Pete Waterman, fuelling speculation in the British press that they were planning to release a duet. SAW and the two singers all denied any plan to do so, with the producers fearing the project would be too "crass" and "commercial", and Minogue expressing concerns a duet would again stir up unwelcome interest in her romance with Donovan. 

However, interest continued to rise, as the proposed track was anticipated to coincide with the wedding of Kylie and Jason's TV characters, Charlene Mitchell and Scott Robinson, on British TV, and would also be a strong contender for Christmas number one on the UK charts. An order of 250,000 copies by British retailer Woolworths finally forced the producers to make the record, with the team feeling they could not shun that scale of demand from the market. 

The song's title was inspired by a greeting card, with Stock and Aitken fleshing out the lyrics along that theme. With time running short, Aitken and Waterman flew to Sydney to record the vocals with Minogue and Donovan, with the session running all night. Work on mixing was then done in London, with Waterman saying he and Stock hated the first completed version so much that he considered completely dumping the record. A last minute remix by engineer Pete Hammond, which changed the drums and moved the harmony vocals to the opening of the track, satisfied the team and the track was then rushed to release.

The song was released as a single on 28 November 1988 in the UK, and was later was included on both Donovan's debut album, and the American version of Minogue's second album, Enjoy Yourself. 

The song has been included on several compilations released by the singers.

Chart performance
"Especially for You" debuted at number two in Australia and stayed at that position for four consecutive weeks. This marked Donovan's highest peak in Australia, but not Minogue's, after setting a record with her first three singles debuting at number one, and who then went on to have four more number ones. In New Zealand, the song debuted at number four, and peaked at number two. To date, this is Donovan's only single to peak in the top twenty, and was at the time Minogue's longest-charting single in that country, staying for 21 weeks, before being surpassed by "Can't Get You Out of My Head" (2001), which peaked at number one. The song then debuted at number two on the UK Singles Chart, staying there for four weeks, rising to number one for three consecutive weeks. The song stayed in the chart for 14 weeks in total. It was Minogue's second number-one out of seven, and Donovan's first of four. In 2014 the song became one of only 154 singles in UK Official Charts History to reach 1 million sales.

In the European markets, the song debuted at number 39 on the French Singles Chart and rose to number three for two consecutive weeks. This was Minogue's highest peaking single in France until 2001's "Can't Get You Out of My Head". The song debuted at number 73 on the Dutch Top 40, peaking at number four for a sole week, and was her highest peaking song until "Can't Get You Out of My Head". The song spent a sole week at number ten in Norway. The song had debuted at number 15 in Sweden, until peaking at number twelve for a solitary week. In Switzerland, the song peaked at number two for a single week, staying in the charts for fifteen weeks. This was Minogue's highest peaking song until "Can't Get You Out of My Head". The song peaked at number twelve in Austria for one week.

"Especially for You" was Minogue's biggest-selling single in the United Kingdom until 2001's "Can't Get You Out of My Head". The duet is also the bestselling Stock Aitken Waterman-penned single, selling more than one million copies to date as of December 2014.

Live performances
Minogue performed the song on the following concert tours:
 Showgirl: The Greatest Hits Tour
 Showgirl: The Homecoming Tour
 Aphrodite World Tour 2011 (only performed during her tour in Manila, Philippines upon request)
 Kiss Me Once Tour (performed upon request in Liverpool)
 A Kylie Christmas at the Royal Albert Hall
 Golden Tour
Summer 2019

The song was also performed on:
 An Audience with Kylie Minogue 2001 TV special, a duet with Kermit the Frog.
 Sport Relief 2014 duet with Kylie and Donovan and David Walliams.

Donovan performed the song on the following concert tours:
 Doin' Fine Tour 1990
 Ten Good Reasons & Greatest Hits Tour 2016

In July 2012, Kylie Minogue and Jason Donovan performed the song at the Hit Factory Live concert, their first performance together since 1989. On 9 September 2018, Donovan joined Minogue on stage to perform the song as part of Minogue's headlining set at Radio 2 Live in Hyde Park.

Track listings
 CD single
 "Especially for You" (extended) – 5:01
 "All I Wanna Do Is Make You Mine" (extended) – 6:00
 "Especially for You" – 3:58

 7-inch single
 "Especially for You" – 3:58
 "All I Wanna Do Is Make You Mine" – 3:34

 12-inch single
 "Especially for You" (extended) – 5:01
 "All I Wanna Do Is Make You Mine" (extended) – 6:00

 7-inch & Cassette single 2022 Reissue
 "Especially for You" - 3:58
 "Especially for You" (Instrumental) - 3:58

Charts and certifications

Weekly charts

Year-end charts

Certifications

Cover versions
 Wink covered the song in Japanese on their 1989 album Especially for You: Yasashisa ni Tsutsumarete.
 Denise van Outen and Johnny Vaughan and pop group Steps released a cover version for UK TV Charity BBC Children in Need in 1998 which peaked at number three on the charts.
 Filipino rock group MYMP recorded an acoustic cover of this song in 2005.

References

External links
"Especially for You" - Lyrics

1980s ballads
1988 singles
1988 songs
European Hot 100 Singles number-one singles
Irish Singles Chart number-one singles
Jason Donovan songs
Kylie Minogue songs
Male–female vocal duets
Pete Waterman Entertainment singles
Pop ballads
Song recordings produced by Stock Aitken Waterman
Songs written by Matt Aitken
Songs written by Mike Stock (musician)
UK Singles Chart number-one singles